The 2018–19 Stetson Hatters women's basketball team represents Stetson University in the 2018–19 NCAA Division I women's basketball season. The Hatters, led by eleventh year head coach Lynn Bria, play their home games at Edmunds Center and are members of the Atlantic Sun Conference. They finished the season 16–16, 11–5 in A-Sun play to finish in second place. They lost in the quarterfinals of the A-Sun women's tournament to Kennesaw State. They were automatic bid to the WNIT where they lost to South Florida in the first round.

Media
All home games and conference road are shown on ESPN3 or A-Sun.TV. Non conference road games are typically available on the opponents website. Audio broadcasts of Hatters games can be found on WSBB AM 1230/1490 with Ryan Rouse on the call.

Roster

Schedule

|-
!colspan=9 style=| Non-conference regular season

|-
!colspan=9 style=| Atlantic Sun regular season

|-
!colspan=9 style=| Atlantic Sun Tournament

|-
!colspan=9 style=| WNIT

Rankings
2018–19 NCAA Division I women's basketball rankings

See also
 2018–19 Stetson Hatters men's basketball team

References

Stetson
Stetson Hatters women's basketball seasons
Stetson Hatters
Stetson Hatters
Stetson